Blumenfeld is a surname. Notable people with the surname include:

 Alan Blumenfeld, American actor
 Amir Blumenfeld, Israeli-American writer and comedian
 Anat Blumenfeld, Israeli biochemist
 Benjamin Blumenfeld (1884–1947), Russian chess player
Daniel Blumenfeld,  American Grammy-winning music producer
Erwin Blumenfeld (1897–1969), German-American photographer
 Fannie Zeissler (born Blumenfeld) (1863–1927), Austrian-American pianist
 Felix Blumenfeld (1863–1931), Russian composer, conductor, and pianist
 Hugh Blumenfeld (b. 1958), American folk musician
 Isadore Blumenfeld (commonly Kid Cann, 1900–1981), American mobster
 J. C. Blumenfeld (–), Polish-British poet
  (1921–2002), Soviet Russian physicist
 Samuel Blumenfeld, American author and educator
 Simon Blumenfeld (1907–2005), English columnist, novelist, playwright and editor
 Simon Blumenfeldt (1760 or 1770 – 1826), Russian Hebrew calligrapher

See also 
 Blumfeld
 Bloomfield (disambiguation)

German-language surnames
Jewish surnames
Surnames from ornamental names